Jimmy Davidson may refer to:

 Jimmy Davidson (Australian footballer) (1904–1953), Australian footballer
 Jimmy Davidson (footballer, born 1873) (1873–?), Scottish footballer
 Jimmy Davidson (footballer, born 1925) (1925–1996), Scottish footballer

See also
 Jim Davidson (disambiguation)
 James Davidson (disambiguation)